A barrel is one of several units of volume applied in various contexts; there are dry barrels, fluid barrels (such as the U.K. beer barrel and U.S. beer barrel), oil barrels, and so forth. In many connections the term  is used almost interchangeably with barrel.

Since medieval times the term  as a unit of measure has had various meanings throughout Europe, ranging from about 100 litres to about 1,000 litres. The name was derived in medieval times from the French , of unknown origin, but still in use, both in French and as derivations in many other languages such as Italian, Polish, and Spanish. In most countries such usage is obsolescent, increasingly superseded by SI units. As a result, the meaning of corresponding words and related concepts (vat, cask, keg etc.) in other languages often refers to a physical container rather than a known measure.

In the international oil market context, however, prices in United States dollars per barrel are commonly used, and the term is variously translated, often to derivations of the Latin / Teutonic root fat (for example vat or Fass).

In other commercial connections, barrel sizes such as beer keg volumes also are standardised in many countries.

Dry goods in the US

 US dry barrel:  
Any barrel that is 7,056 cubic inches is recognized as equivalent.
 US barrel for cranberries  
No equivalent in cubic inches is given in the statute, but later regulations specify it as 5,826 cubic inches.  
Some products have a standard weight or volume that constitutes a barrel: 
 Cornmeal, 
 Cement (including Portland cement),  or 
Sugar,  
 Wheat or rye flour,   or 
 Lime (mineral),  large barrel, or  small barrel
 Butter and cheese in UK, 
 Salt,

Fluid barrel in the US and UK
Fluid barrels vary depending on what is being measured and where. The size of beer kegs in the US is based loosely on fractions of the US beer barrel. When referring to beer barrels or kegs in many countries, the term may be used for the commercial package units independent of actual volume, where common range for professional use is 20–60 L, typically a DIN or Euro keg of 50 L.

History

Richard III, King of England from 1483 until 1485, had defined the wine puncheon as a cask holding 84 wine gallons and a wine tierce as holding 42 wine gallons. Custom had made the 42 gallon watertight tierce a standard container for shipping eel, salmon, herring, molasses, wine, whale oil, and many other commodities in the English colonies by 1700. After the American Revolution in 1776, American merchants continued to use the same size barrels.

Oil barrel 

Oil companies that are listed on American stock exchanges typically report their production in terms of volume and use the units bbl (one barrel), or kbbl or Mbbl (one kilobarrel, one thousand barrels), or MMbbl (one million barrels), and occasionally for wider comprehensive statistics Gbbl (or sometimes Gbl), for giga-barrel (one billion barrels). There is a conflict concerning the units for oil barrels (see ). For all other physical quantities, according to the International System of Units, the uppercase letter "M" means "mega-" ("one million"), for example: MHz (one million hertz, or megahertz), MW (one million watts, or megawatt), MeV (one million electronvolt, or megaelectronvolt). But due to tradition, the Mbbl acronym is used today meaning "one thousand bbl", as a heritage of the roman number "M" for Latin "mille" meaning "one thousand". On the other hand, there are efforts to avoid this ambiguity, and most of the barrel dealers today prefer to use kbbl, instead of Mbbl, mbbl, MMbbl or mmbbl.

Outside the United States, volumes of oil are usually reported in cubic metres (m3) instead of oil barrels. Cubic metre is the basic volume unit in the International System. In Canada, oil companies measure oil in cubic metres, but convert to barrels on export, since most of Canada's oil production is exported to the US. The nominal conversion factor is 1 cubic metre = 6.2898 oil barrels, but conversion is generally done by custody transfer meters on the border, since the volumes are specified at different temperatures, and the exact conversion factor depends on both density and temperature. Canadian companies operate internally and report to Canadian governments in cubic metres, but often convert to US barrels for the benefit of American investors and oil marketers. They generally quote prices in Canadian dollars per cubic metre to other Canadian companies, but use US dollars per barrel in financial reports and press statements, making it appear to the outside world that they operate in barrels.

Companies on the European stock exchanges report the mass of oil in tonnes. Since different varieties of petroleum have different densities, however, there is not a single conversion between mass and volume. In contrast, one tonne of crude oil might occupy , and one tonne of gasoline will require .

History
The measurement of an "oil barrel" originated in the early Pennsylvania oil fields. The Drake Well, the first oil well in the US, was drilled in Pennsylvania in 1859, and an oil boom followed in the 1860s. When oil production began, there was no standard container for oil, so oil and petroleum products were stored and transported in barrels of different shapes and sizes. Some of these barrels would originally have been used for other products, such as beer, fish, molasses, or turpentine. Both the  barrels (based on the old English wine measure), the tierce (159 litres) and the  whiskey barrels were used. Also,  barrels were in common use. The 40 gallon whiskey barrel was the most common size used by early oil producers, since they were readily available at the time.

Around 1866, early oil producers in Pennsylvania came to the conclusion that shipping oil in a variety of different containers was causing buyer distrust. They decided they needed a standard unit of measure to convince buyers that they were getting a fair volume for their money, and settled on the standard wine tierce, which was two gallons larger than the standard whisky barrel. The Weekly Register, an Oil City, Pennsylvania newspaper, stated on August 31, 1866 that "the oil producers have issued the following circular":

And by that means, King Richard III's English wine tierce became the American standard oil barrel.

By 1872, the standard oil barrel was firmly established as 42 US-gallons. The 42 gallon standard oil barrel was officially adopted by the Petroleum Producers Association in 1872 and by the U.S. Geological Survey and the U.S. Bureau of Mines in 1882.

In modern times, many different types of oil, chemicals, and other products are transported in steel drums. They are called 200 litre or 200 kg drums outside the United States. In the United Kingdom and its former dependencies, a  drum was used, even though all those countries now officially use the metric system and the drums are filled to 200 litres. Thus, the 42 US-gallon oil barrel is a unit of measure, and is no longer a physical container used to transport crude oil, as most petroleum is moved in pipelines or oil tankers. In the United States, the 42 US-gallon size of barrel as a unit of measure is largely confined to the oil industry, while different sizes of barrel are used in other industries. Nearly all other countries use the metric system.

Definitions and units
The abbreviations Mbbl and MMbbl refer to one thousand and one million barrels respectively. These are derived from the Latin "mille", meaning "thousand". This is different from the SI convention for where "M" stands for "mega" representing million, from the Greek for "large". Outside of the oil industry, the unit Mbbl (megabarrel) can sometimes stand for one million barrels. The "b" may have been doubled originally to indicate the plural (1 bl, 2 bbl), or possibly it was doubled to eliminate any confusion with bl as a symbol for the bale. Some sources assert that "bbl" originated as a symbol for "blue barrels" delivered by Standard Oil in its early days. However, while Ida Tarbell's 1904 Standard Oil Company history acknowledged the "holy blue barrel", the abbreviation "bbl" had been in use well before the 1859 birth of the U.S. petroleum industry.

Oil wells recover not just oil from the ground, but also natural gas and water. The term barrels of liquid per day (BLPD) refers to the total volume of liquid that is recovered. Similarly, barrels of oil equivalent or BOE is a value that accounts for both oil and natural gas while ignoring any water that is recovered.

Other terms are used when discussing only oil. These terms can refer to either the production of crude oil at an oil well, the conversion of crude oil to other products at an oil refinery, or the overall consumption of oil by a region or country. One common term is barrels per day (BPD, BOPD, bbl/d, bpd, bd, or b/d), where 1 BPD is equivalent to 0.0292 gallons per minute. One BPD also becomes 49.8 tonnes per year. At an oil refinery, production is sometimes reported as barrels per calendar day (b/cd or bcd), which is total production in a year divided by the days in that year. Likewise, barrels per stream day (BSD or BPSD) is the quantity of oil product produced by a single refining unit during continuous operation for 24 hours.

Burning one tonne of light, synthetic, or heavy crude yields 38.51, 39.40, or 40.90 GJ (thermal) respectively (10.70, 10.94, or 11.36 MW·h), so 1 tonne per day of synthetic crude is about 456 kW of thermal power and 1 bpd of synthetic crude is about 378 kW (slightly less for light crude, slightly more for heavy crude).

Accuracy when converting from barrel to cubic metre
When used to denote a volume, one barrel is exactly 42 US gallons and is easily converted to any other unit of volume. As the US gallon since 1893 is defined as 3.785411784 litre, a volume of one barrel is exactly 158.987294928 litres. Using the approximate value 159 litre is about 0.008% off.

In the oil industry, following the definition of the American Petroleum Institute, a standard barrel of oil is often taken to mean the amount of oil that, at a standard pressure  and temperature , would occupy a volume of exactly . This standard barrel of oil will occupy a different volume at different pressures and temperatures. A standard barrel in this context is thus not simply a measure of volume, but of volume under specific conditions. The task of converting this standard barrel of oil to a standard cubic metre of oil is complicated by the fact that the standard cubic metre is defined by the American Petroleum Institute to mean the amount of oil that at 101.325 kPa and  occupies 1 cubic metre. The fact that the conditions are not exactly the same means that an exact conversion is impossible unless the exact expansion coefficient of the crude is known, and this will vary from one crude oil to another.

Conversely, a heavy oil with a density of 934 kg/m3 (API gravity of 20) might only increase in volume by 0.039%. If physically measuring the density at a new temperature is not possible, then tables of empirical data can be used to accurately predict the change in density. In turn, this allows maximum accuracy when converting between standard barrel and standard cubic metre. The logic above also implies the same level of accuracy in measurements for barrels if there is a  error in measuring the temperature at time of measuring the volume.

For ease of trading, communication and financial accounting, international commodity exchanges often set a conversion factor for benchmark crude oils. For instance the conversion factor set by the New York Mercantile Exchange (NYMEX) for Western Canadian Select (WCS) crude oil traded at Hardisty, Alberta, Canada is 6.29287 U.S. barrels per cubic metre, despite the uncertainty in converting the volume for crude oil. Regulatory authorities in producing countries set standards for measurement accuracy of produced hydrocarbons, where such measurements affect taxes or royalties to the government. In the United Kingdom, for instance, the measurement accuracy required is ±0.25%.

Qualifiers
A barrel can technically be used to specify any volume. Since the actual nature of the fluids being measured varies along the stream, sometimes qualifiers are used to clarify what is being specified. In the oil field, it is often important to differentiate between rates of production of fluids, which may be a mix of oil and water, and rates of production of the oil itself. If a well is producing 10 mbd of fluids with a 20% water cut, then the well would also be said to be producing 8,000 barrels of oil a day (bod).

In other circumstances, it can be important to include gas in production and consumption figures. Normally, gas amount is measured in standard cubic feet or cubic metres for volume (as well as in kg or Btu, which don't depend on pressure or temperature). But when necessary, such volume is converted to a volume of oil of equivalent enthalpy of combustion. Production and consumption using this analogue is stated in barrels of oil equivalent per day (boed).

In the case of water-injection wells, in the United States it is common to refer to the injectivity rate in barrels of water per day (bwd). In Canada, it is measured in cubic metres per day (m3/d). In general, water injection rates will be stated in the same units as oil production rates, since the usual objective is to replace the volume of oil produced with a similar volume of water to maintain reservoir pressure.

See also

 55 gallon drum
 Barrel
 Barrel of oil equivalent
 English brewery cask units
 English wine cask units
 Imperial units
 List of unusual units of measurement
 Petroleum
 Petroleum pricing around the world
 Standard Barrel Act For Fruits, Vegetables, and Dry Commodities
 United States customary units
 Units of measurement

Notes

References 

Brewing
Customary units of measurement in the United States
Imperial units
Petroleum
Units of volume
Alcohol measurement